North of Albany is a 2022 Canadian drama film directed by Marianne Farley (in her directorial debut) from a screenplay she co-wrote with Claude Brie. It stars Céline Bonnier, Zeneb Blanchet, and Eliott Plamondon as a Canadian family who run away to the United States. The film was shot in the province of Quebec in the midst of the COVID-19 pandemic in late 2020. The film premiered at Cinéfest on September 19, 2022, and is scheduled to be released in theaters on December 2, 2022, by Maison 4:3.

Premise
A single mother, Annie, flees from the Canadian city of Montreal with her two children Sarah and Felix after Sarah physically attacks a bully. The family's car breaks down, stranding them in the Adirondacks in the American state of New York. There, they meet local mechanic Paul who helps them confront the real reasons they are on the run.

Cast
 Céline Bonnier as Annie, the mother of Sarah and Felix
 Zeneb Blanchet as Sarah, the 15-year-old teenage daughter of Annie and sister of Felix
 Eliott Plamondon as Felix, the 10-year-old son of Annie and brother of Sarah
 Rick Roberts as Paul, a mechanic who lives in the Adirondacks, and Emma's nephew
 Naomi Cormier as Hope
 Sean Tucker as Richard
 Kelly Depeault as Martine
 Frédéric Pierre as Mme Briére
 Janet Land as Emma, a 65-year-old widow and Paul's aunt

Production
North of Albany was announced on June 17, 2019, when Telefilm Canada revealed three films they would fund in the upcoming months. In December 2019, SODEC announced that they would also finance the film. Marianne Farley got the idea for the film after her car broke down close to the Adirondack Park while she was visiting her brother in the United States. Calling the mishap a "shitty adventure", Farley wrote the initial screenplay with her then-spouse Claude Brie. Farley also produced the film with Benoit Beaulieu under their production banner Slykid & Skykid. It is the company's second project after 2020's Our Own (Les Nôtres).

The village of Abercorn, Quebec, stood in for the Adirondacks. Principal photography, delayed several months due to the COVID-19 pandemic, began on October 7, 2020, and concluded on November 16. The crew followed COVID-19 safety protocols by wearing masks, practicing social distancing and receiving frequent temperature measurements while working. Filming in also took place in the Laurentian Mountains, the Eastern Townships of Quebec, Châteauguay, the Entrelacs, Lanaudière, Sutton, and West Brome. Director of photography Benoit Beaulieu and camera operator Benoît C. Gauthier shot the film with an Arri Alexa Mini LF camera and vintage Leica R lenses. Drone shots were filmed by aerial photography company DroneStudio Canada. Farley said she does not regret making the film in the midst of a global pandemic. The film's editor was Aube Foglia, and the musical score was composed by Frannie Holder.

Release
The film premiered at Cinéfest on September 19, 2022, and was released in theaters on December 2, 2022.

References

External links
 

2022 directorial debut films
2022 drama films
2022 independent films
2022 multilingual films
2020s Canadian films
2020s drama road movies
2020s English-language films
2020s French-language films
2020s psychological drama films
Canadian drama road movies
Canadian independent films
Canadian multilingual films
Canadian psychological drama films
English-language Canadian films
Film productions suspended due to the COVID-19 pandemic
Films about single parent families
Films set in Montreal
Films set in New York (state)
Films shot in Montreal
French-language Canadian films